Gladsaxe Municipality has in its history been a strong area for parties of the red bloc. In the 2019 Danish general election, it was the municipality where the bloc received the 5th highest % of votes. Locally, the Social Democrats had held the mayor's position all years from 1913 and on. 

In the 2017 election, the Social Democrats had won 10 seats, and kept it's unbeaten streak as the largest party in the council. Trine Græse from the party would eventually become the mayor.

In this election, the Social Democrats would once again become the largest party, although they lost 2 seats. The traditional red bloc won 16 seats, and this meant Trine Græse had good chances to continue. It would eventually be confirmed that she could continue as the mayor, after the Social Democrats reached an agreement with the Danish Social Liberal Party and the Green Left

Electoral system
For elections to Danish municipalities, a number varying from 9 to 31 are chosen to be elected to the municipal council. The seats are then allocated using the D'Hondt method and a closed list proportional representation.
Gladsaxe Municipality had 25 seats in 2021

Unlike in Danish General Elections, in elections to municipal councils, electoral alliances are allowed.

Electoral alliances  

Electoral Alliance 1

Electoral Alliance 2

Electoral Alliance 3

Results

Notes

References 

Gladsaxe